Nelson Eduardo Fuentes Menjívar is a Salvadoran economist and researcher. He served as El Salvador's Minister of Finance from 1 June 2019 until his resignation on 28 July 2020.

References

Living people
Finance ministers of El Salvador
1978 births